Yee Tit Kwan (7 January 1927 – 14 January 2017) is a Singaporean basketball player. He competed in the men's tournament at the 1956 Summer Olympics.

References

External links
 

1927 births
2017 deaths
Singaporean men's basketball players
Olympic basketball players of Singapore
Basketball players at the 1956 Summer Olympics
Singaporean sportspeople of Chinese descent
20th-century Singaporean people